The Type 2 rifle grenade launcher was an attachment for the Japanese Type 38 and Type 99 rifles that allowed them to fire special hollow charge grenades. It was a version of the German Schiessbecher grenade launcher. Two grenades were produced for the launcher: a 30 mm calibre grenade and a larger 40 mm calibre grenade, both designated Type 2. The launcher sits over the end of the barrel, held in place with a clamping device. A special crimped blank cartridge or wooden bullet is used to fire the grenades.

The rear of the grenades is pre-rifled to mate with the rifling in the launcher. The rifling ensures that the grenade is spun in flight, giving it stability and arming the rotational fuze. Both grenades use a largely identical fuze, which makes up the rear part of the grenade. On impact, momentum carries the striker assembly forward, overcoming the resistant force of a creep spring into the detonator.

References

See also

World War II infantry weapons of Japan
Grenade launchers